is a railway station located in Kita-9-sen 14-gō (北9線14号), Pippu, Kamikawa District, Hokkaidō, and is operated by the Hokkaido Railway Company.

Lines Serviced
JR Hokkaidō
Sōya Main Line

Adjacent stations

External links
Ekikara Time Table - JR Ranru Station (Japanese)

Railway stations in Hokkaido Prefecture
Railway stations in Japan opened in 1898